Tywan Claxton (born November 25, 1992 in Cleveland, Ohio) is an American mixed martial artist and former amateur wrestler.  He most notably competed in Bellator MMA at featherweight.

Early life
Claxton was born in Cleveland, Ohio, where he went to Frank L Wiley Middle School.  Claxton formerly wrestled at King University in Bristol, Tennessee where he studied medicine. He also wrestled and gained All-American status in Division 2 at the 141-pound weight class. In a 2014 dual against Kent State, Claxton defeated Kyle Bauer via 8-2 decision. Bauer, wrestling up a weight class, has been hailed for his gutsy performance.  In 2015, Claxton moved to the University of Ohio, Claxton wrestled for two years for the Ohio Bobcats and was a two time division 1 national qualifier ; Claxton was set to compete his senior year however, days before the season was scheduled to start, Claxton was deemed ineligible to wrestle because of a transfer rule set by the NCAA. Claxton graduated with a degree in Healthcare Marketing.  Claxton taught himself how to code and spends his spare time on the computer. Claxton compiled a 8–0 amateur MMA record after deciding to train in MMA.

Mixed martial arts career
Claxton began training in mixed martial arts after not being able to compete in wrestling his senior year at Ohio University. Although he dabbled in the sport in college, he ultimately started real training once he received an invitation to move to Florida to train with the Blackzilians from wrestling coach Greg Jones. Claxton trained among the best fighters in the world, with teammates in both Ultimate Fighting Championship and Bellator MMA.

Bellator MMA
It was announced that Claxton had signed with Bellator MMA in August 2017.

Claxton made his professional MMA debut at Bellator 186 in University Park, Pennsylvania vs Johnny Bonilla-Bowman.  Claxton successfully made his debut with an emphatic flying knee to knock out his opponent in the first round.  It was deemed as a knockout of the year contender.

Claxton had his second professional fight at Bellator 194 in Uncasville, Connecticut vs Jose Perez.  Claxton used his wrestling and top game to dominate his opponent and ultimately won the fight by second round tko.

On the 18th of August 2018, Claxton had his third professional bout at Bellator 204 in Sioux Falls, South Dakota vs Cris Lencioni, who gave up a percentage of his fight purse by missing weight by 2.4 pounds.  Claxton used his superior striking and ultimately using his wrestling to win a clear decision over three rounds.

Tywan then had his fourth fight against Kaeo Meyer at Bellator 212, in Bellator's debut in Hawaii, at the Neal S. Blaisdell Center in Honolulu.  Claxton would win the fight by TKO in the second round.

Claxton's fifth fight came against James Bennett at Bellator 221 in Chicago on May 11, 2019. He won the bout by TKO in the third round. Claxton infamously began speaking to 50 Cent, seated near the cage, during the fight while engaging with Bennett on the ground.

Claxton next faced Emmanuel Sanchez in the opening round of the Bellator featherweight world grand prix at Bellator 226 on September 7, 2019. He lost the bout via second round submission.

Claxton faced Braydon Akeo at Bellator 235 on December 20, 2019. After largely winning the striking exchanges and taking Akeo down, Claxton won the bout via unanimous decision.

Claxton faced former Legacy Fighting Alliance Featherweight Champion Justin Gonzales at Bellator 260 on June 11, 2021. He lost the fight by split decision.

On July 10, 2021, it was announced that he was no longer under contract with Bellator.

Mixed martial arts record

|-
|Loss
|align=center|6–3
|Justin Gonzales
|Decision (split)
|Bellator 260
|
|align=center|3
|align=center|5:00
|Uncasville, Connecticut, United States
|
|-
|Loss
|align=center|6–2
|Jay Jay Wilson
|Decision (split)
|Bellator 242 
|
|align=center|3
|align=center|5:00
|Uncasville, Connecticut, United States 
|
|-
|Win
|align=center|6–1
|Braydon Akeo
|Decision (unanimous)
|Bellator 235 
|
|align=center|3
|align=center|5:00
|Honolulu, Hawaii, United States 
|
|-
|Loss
|align=center|5–1
|Emmanuel Sanchez 
|Submission (triangle choke)
|Bellator 226 
|
|align=center|2
|align=center|4:11
|San Jose, California, United States 
|
|-
|Win
|align=center|5–0
|James Bennett
|TKO (punches)
|Bellator 221
|
|align=center|3
|align=center|2:09
|Rosemont, Illinois, United States
|
|-
|Win
|align=center|4–0
|Kaeo Meyer
|TKO (punches)
|Bellator 212
|
|align=center|1
|align=center|2:56
|Honolulu, Hawaii, United States
|
|-
|Win
|align=center|3–0
|Cris Lencioni
|Decision (unanimous)
|Bellator 204
|
|align=center|3
|align=center|5:00
|Sioux Falls, South Dakota, United States
|
|-
|Win
|align=center|2–0
|Jose Perez
|TKO (elbows and punches)
|Bellator 194
|
|align=center|2
|align=center|3:39
|Uncasville, Connecticut, United States
|
|-
|Win
|align=center|1–0
|Jonny Bonilla-Bowman
|KO (flying knee)
|Bellator 186
|
|align=center|1
|align=center|1:29
|University Park, Pennsylvania, United States
|

References 

1992 births
Living people
Sportspeople from Fort Lauderdale, Florida
Mixed martial artists from Florida
American male mixed martial artists
Featherweight mixed martial artists
Mixed martial artists utilizing Muay Thai
Mixed martial artists utilizing boxing
Mixed martial artists utilizing collegiate wrestling
Mixed martial artists utilizing jujutsu
American Muay Thai practitioners